Loring Hall is a private mental health care facility in North Cray, London Borough of Bexley. Formerly known as Wollet Hall or Woollet Hall, it is a Grade II listed building.

History

The present building was constructed in 1760 on the site of an earlier Tudor house known as "Waletts". Its owner in this period was Neighbour Frith, Esq, a London silk merchant. Frith was the last member of a family who had held land in North Cray for many years: his father, John, and grandfather, Roger, are buried at nearby North Cray parish church.

In 1776 Frith willed Woollet Hall to his nephew, the Rev. Edward Cockayn, who adopted the surname Frith. Cockayn subsequently leased the house to a Mr Trimmer, probably Joshua Kirby Trimmer of Bexleyheath, whose son, the geologist Joshua Trimmer, was born at North Cray.

From 1811 the house was the country residence of British Foreign Secretary, Viscount Castlereagh, later Marquess Londonderry. In 1822 Castlereagh, after suffering a possible nervous breakdown, committed suicide there by cutting his own throat. His residence at the house is still commemorated by a blue plaque installed by English Heritage.

Subsequent to Castlereagh's ownership the house was owned by a banker, Richard Gosling. The Gosling family did not use the name Woollet Hall during their time there. By the 1850s the Hall had been purchased by Frederick Friend, whose family occupied it until the late 19th century.

In 1939 the building and grounds were purchased by Goldsmiths College and Woollet Hall was renamed Loring Hall after the first warden of Goldsmiths College, Captain William Loring, who was killed at Gallipoli during the First World War. The main part of the hall was used as a hall of residence for male students and the stable block and associated house were used as an accommodation for a Head of Hall. The grounds became football, hockey and cricket fields for use by the students of Goldsmiths.

Goldsmiths College sold the hall and grounds to Bupa sometime in the 1980s, who converted it into a care home. In 1999 it was bought by the charity Sargent Cancer Care for Children and was renamed Malcolm Sargent House.

In 2003 it was sold again to a company called Oakfields Care and since March 2004 it has been a care facility for those with learning disabilities.

See also
 Healthcare in Kent

References

External links

Houses completed in 1760
Grade II listed buildings in Kent
Hospitals in Kent
Psychiatric hospitals in England
Health in Kent
Grade II listed houses
Country houses in Kent